The 2017 24H Proto Series was the first season of the 24H Proto Series, presented by Creventic. The races were contested with LMP3 cars and Group CN cars.

Calendar

Notes
Events denoted by "NC" are non-championship races.
Scheduled Paul Ricard events have been cancelled due to a lack of entries.
Events 1 and 2 are run in conjunction with the 24H Series.

Entry List

Results and standings

Race results
Bold indicates overall winner.

See also
24H Series
2017 24H Series
2017 Touring Car Endurance Series

References

External links

24H Proto Series
2017